Crotaphopeltis hippocrepis is a species of snake of the family Colubridae.

Geographic range
The snake is found in Sub-Saharan Africa.

References 

Reptiles described in 1843
Reptiles of Africa
Colubrids